Canada competed at the 1906 Intercalated Games in Athens, Greece. Three athletes, all men, competed in four events in one sport. These games are not now considered as official Olympic games by the International Olympic Committee, and results are not included in official records and medal counts.

Medalists

Athletics

Field

References

Nations at the 1906 Intercalated Games
1906
Intercalated Games